Nova is a given name of Latin origin meaning "new".

It is in regular use for both males and females. In the United States, the name has been in use since the 1800s. It first ranked among the top 1,000 names for newborn girls in the United States in 2011 and has been among the top 50 most used names for newborn American girls since 2017. Novah, a variant spelling, has ranked among the top 1,000 names given to girls recently as well. Elaborations of the name such as Novalee, Novalynn, and Novarae, all with many spelling variants, are also well used for American girls. Nova was among the five most popular names for Black newborn girls in the American state of Virginia in 2022.   Noova is a Finnish variant.

It has also increased in usage for girls in European countries in recent years. It is among the top 100 names in The Netherlands and Sweden and among the top 200 names in Norway in recent years and is also increasing in use in the United Kingdom.

People

 Nova (singer), a Puerto Rican reggaeton and hip hop singer, part of duo Nova & Jory
 Nova (wrestler), ring name of American pro wrestler Mike Bucci
 Nova, stage name of Shaheeda Sinckler, winner of the 2020 Scottish Album of the Year Award
 Nova Arianto (born 1978), Indonesian professional footballer of Tionghoan descent
 Nova Meierhenrich (born 1973), German television presenter
 Nova Miller (born 2001), Swedish singer, dancer, actress, and multi-instrumentalist
 Nova Peris (born 1971), Aboriginal Australian athlete and former politician
 Nova Pilbeam (1919-2015), British actress
 Nova Ren Suma (born 1975), American #1 New York Times best selling author of young adult novels
Nova Rockafeller, stage name of Nova Leigh Paholek (born 1988), an independent Canadian rapper, singer, songwriter, and music video director

Notes 

Unisex given names